Miramichi Valley High School is one of two public, English language high schools in the city of Miramichi, New Brunswick, Canada.  It serves principally residents from the north side of the Miramichi River, both from the city of Miramichi, and smaller communities distributed from Tabusintac in the east, to Upper Blackville in the west.  The school opened its doors in January 1972 to students in grades 10–12, with Charles Hubbard as principal.  In 1994 grade 9 classes were added. The school's mascot is Samoo the Pulamoo a boxing Salmon.

See also
 Anglophone North School District

References

External links
 MVHS Official Website

Schools in Miramichi, New Brunswick
High schools in New Brunswick